Stefan Vukanović Nemanjić was a Serbian prince, the son of Grand Prince Vukan Nemanjić (r. 1202-1204) and the nephew of Grand Prince and King Stefan the First-Crowned (r. 1196–1217;–1228). He built the Morača monastery.

Life
Stefan was the son of Grand Prince Vukan, who was self-styled "King of Duklja, Dalmatia, Travunia, Toplica and Hvosno" (1195), and ruled Serbia briefly in 1202-1204. Stefan Vukanović, titled knez ("prince") had two brothers, the eldest Đorđe, who was the Grand Prince of Zeta (1208–1216), and youngest Dmitar, a župan (county lord) and monk. In 1252, Stefan Vukanović built the Morača monastery.

Morača monastery

Stefan Vukanović built the monastery by the Morača river, in the heartlands of Duklja (Zeta, in modern south-central Montenegro). It was founded in 1252, during the rule of King Stefan Uroš I (r. 1243–1276), on the right banks of the Morača, in the wide part of the Morača canyon, called Donja Morača. It overlooks the river from 40 metres above sea level. Nearby is the Svetigora waterfall, regarded the finest waterfall of Montenegro.

See also 

 Nemanjić family tree

References

13th-century Serbian royalty
Nemanjić dynasty
Medieval Serbian Orthodox clergy
Serbian princes
Founders of Christian monasteries